The American Foreign Policy Council (AFPC) is a 501(c)3 non-profit located in Washington, DC. It has largely been chaired by conservatives, including officials that served in conservative Presidential administrations. Its foreign and defense policy specialists provide information to members of the US Congress, the Executive Branch, and the US policymaking community, as well as world leaders outside of the US (particularly in the former USSR).

AFPC publishes reports that analyze foreign policy. Common topics include security (missile defense, arms control, energy security, espionage) as well as the ongoing status of democracy and market economies.

Board of advisors
In March 2017, AFPC’s board of advisors consisted of
 Paula Dobriansky, former Under Secretary of State for Democracy and Global Affairs
 Newt Gingrich, former Speaker of the United States House of Representatives
 Robert Joseph, former Under Secretary of State for Arms Control and International Security Affairs
 Bob Kasten, former Senator from Wisconsin
 Richard T. McCormack, former United States Under Secretary of State for Economic Growth, Energy, and the Environment
 Robert McFarlane, former National Security Advisor
 Tom Ridge, former United States Secretary of Homeland Security
 William Schneider Jr., former Under Secretary of State for International Security Affairs
 R. James Woolsey Jr., former Director of Central Intelligence
 Dov S. Zakheim, former Under Secretary of Defense (Comptroller)

References

External links 
afpc.org
Grant profile of the AFPC, Media Transparency

Foreign policy and strategy think tanks in the United States
Non-profit organizations based in Washington, D.C.